Cassius Mailula (born 12 June 2001) is a South African soccer player who primarily plays as an attacking midfielder. Originally hailing from Limpopo, Cassius joined the Mamelodi Sundowns academy in 2016 and stood out in the DStv Diski Challenge team.

He made his senior team debut in a 1-0 win against Chippa United in September 2022. He quickly became a prolific goalscorer.

Club Career

Cassius Maluila is a South African born footballer that plays for professional team Mamelodi Sundowns

He scored his first two goals for Mamelodi Sundowns other 25 October 2022

Career statistics

Honours
'''Carling Black Label Cup
Winner : 2022

References

2001 births
Living people
South African soccer players
Mamelodi Sundowns F.C. players
South African Premier Division players